Agama anchietae, also known commonly as Anchieta's agama and the western rock agama, is a species of lizard in the family Agamidae. The species is native to southern Africa.

Etymology
The specific name, anchietae, is in honor of Portuguese naturalist José Alberto de Oliveira Anchieta, who was an explorer of Africa.

Geographic range
A. anchietae is found in Angola, Botswana, Congo, Namibia, and South Africa.

Habitat
A. anchietae is found in a variety of habitats including desert, shrubland, and grassland.

Diet
The diet of A. anchietae consists of insects (primarily ants).

Description
A. anchietae shows signs of sexual dimorphism. Males tend to have a wider head and a longer tail than females.

Reproduction
A. anchietae is oviparous.

References

Further reading
Bocage JVB (1896). "Sur deux Agames d'Angola à écaillure héterogène". Jornal de Sciencias Mathematicas, Physicas e Naturaes, Academia Real das Sciencias de Lisboa, Segunda Série 4: 127–130. (Agama anchietae, new species, pp. 129–130). (in French).

Agama (genus)
Agamid lizards of Africa
Reptiles of Angola
Reptiles of Botswana
Reptiles of Namibia
Taxa named by José Vicente Barbosa du Bocage
Reptiles described in 1896